Buckingham Township is the name of some places in the U.S. state of Pennsylvania:
Buckingham Township, Bucks County, Pennsylvania
Buckingham Township, Wayne County, Pennsylvania

Pennsylvania township disambiguation pages